Acanella is a genus of deep sea bamboo coral of the family Isididae. Acanella are mainly studied and found in Hawaii, they are able to survive in high-flow sites and are preyed upon by nudibranch mollusks. It has a high fecundity and small size that allows high dispersal and recruitment; however, it has been classified as a vulnerable marine organism due to its vulnerability to bottom fishing gear. It contains the following species:
Acanella africana Kükenthal, 1915
Acanella arbuscula (Johnson, 1862)
Acanella aurelia Saucier & France, 2017
Acanella chiliensis Wright & Studer, 1889
Acanella dispar Bayer, 1990
Acanella furcata Thomson, 1929
Acanella gregori (Gray, 1870)
Acanella microspiculata Aurivillius, 1931
Acanella rigida Wright & Studer, 1889
Acanella robusta Thomson & Henderson, 1906
Acanella scarletae Saucier & France, 2017
Acanella verticillata Kükenthal, 1915
Acanella weberi Nutting, 1910

References

External links

Isididae
Octocorallia genera